Be Yourself is the ninth solo album by American singer-songwriter Patti LaBelle. It was released by MCA Records on June 26, 1989 in the United States. Her second album with the company following her 1986 platinum album Winner in You, it features the single, "If You Asked Me To" which was also featured on the soundtrack to the James Bond movie, Licence to Kill (1989), and the R&B top ten Prince-written hit "Yo Mister." The album marked LaBelle's foray into new jack swing music with the tracks "I Got It Like That", produced by Full Force, and "Love 89", another Prince contribution.

Track listing

Personnel 
Credits lifted from the album's liner notes.

 Patti LaBelle – lead vocals, backing vocals (2, 3, 11)
 Aaron Zigman – synthesizer programming (1), synth bass (1), arrangements (1)
 Raymond Jones – keyboards (2), arrangements (2)
 James "Budd" Ellison – keyboards (3, 9, 11), percussion (3)
 Nathaniel Wilke – keyboards (3, 9), synth bass (3, 9), synth drums (3), synthesizer arrangements (3, 11)
 Prince – all instruments (4, 6)
 Full Force – all instruments (5), backing vocals (5), arrangements (5)
 Walter Afanasieff – keyboards (7)
 David Sancious – keyboards (7)
 Ren Klyce – Fairlight CMI (7)
 Fred McFarlane – programming (7)
 Brad Cole – keyboards (8)
 Jim Salamone – synthesizer programming (9, 11), drum programming (9, 11), LinnDrum overdubs (9)
 Michael Boddicker – synthesizers (10)
 Randy Kerber – acoustic piano (10), Yamaha DX7 (10)
 George Duke – acoustic piano (11)
 Michael Landau – guitars (1)
 Corrado Rustici – guitars (7) 
 Mark Liggett – guitars (8)
 Herb Smith – guitars (9, 11)
 Dann Huff – guitars (10)
 Randy Jackson – Moog bass (7)
 Dominic Genova – bass (8)
 Neil Stubenhaus – bass (10)
 John Robinson – drums (1)
 Larry Robinson – drum programming (2)
 Narada Michael Walden – drums (7), programming (7)
 Tom Walsh – drums (8)
 Jeff Porcaro – drums (10)
 Lenny Castro – percussion (1, 10)
 Gigi Gonaway – cymbals (7)
 Eric Wood – percussion (9)
 Gerald Albright – saxophone (2)
 Kenny G – saxophone solo (7)
 Michael Patterson Jr. – soprano sax solo (9)
 Jack Faith – horns (11), strings (11)
 Sami McKinney – arrangements (2)
 Jerry Hey – string arrangements (7)
 Burt Bacharach – arrangements (10)
 Frank DeCaro – session coordinator and contractor (10)
 Paulette Brown – backing vocals (1)
 Bunny Hull – backing vocals (1)
 Valerie Pinkston-Mayo – backing vocals (1)
 Desiree Coleman – backing vocals (3)
 Annette Hardeman – backing vocals (3, 9, 11)
 Paula Holloway – backing vocals (3, 9, 11)
 Thelma Houston – backing vocals (3)
 Lisa Lisa –  backing vocals (5)
 Cheryl "Pepsii" Riley – backing vocals (5)
 Kitty Beethoven – backing vocals (7)
 Jim Gilstrap – backing vocals (7)
 Melisa Kary – backing vocals (7)
 Claytoven Richardson – backing vocals (7)
 Mona Campbell – backing vocals (8)
 Ronee Martin – backing vocals (8)
 Lyndie White – backing vocals (8)
 Deborah Dukes – backing vocals (9, 11)
 Charlene Holloway – backing vocals (9)
 Phil Perry – backing vocals (10)
 Joe Pizzulo – backing vocals (10)
 Stephanie Spruill – backing vocals (10)
 Julia Waters – backing vocals (10)
 Maxine Waters – backing vocals (10)
 Oren Waters – backing vocals (10)
 Gabriel Hardeman – backing vocals (11)
 O.J. Smallewood – backing vocals (11)
 Freddie Washington – backing vocals (11)
 The Music Ministry Workshop Choir – backing vocals (11)

Production and Technical 
 Patti LaBelle – executive producer 
 James "Budd" Ellison – production supervisor 
 Cheryl Dickerson – A&R direction 
 Darren Klein – recording (1), mixing (1)
 Larry DeCarmine – recording (2)
 Larry Ferguson – recording (2), mixing (2)
 Arthur Stoppe – recording (3, 9, 11), mixing (3, 9, 11)
 Joe Tarsia – recording (3, 9, 11), mixing (3, 9, 11)
 Michael Tarsia – recording (3, 9, 11), mixing (3, 9, 11)
 Bob Fintz – mixing (3)
 Louil Silas Jr. – remixing (3, 11)
 Erik Zobler – remix engineer (3)
 Susan Rogers – recording (4)
 Alan Gregorie – remix engineer (4)
 Timmy Regisford – remixing (4)
 Tony Maserati – recording (5), mixing (5)
 Full Force – mixing (5)
 Eddie Miller – recording (6)
 David Frazer – recording (7), mixing (7)
 Michael J. McDonald – recording (8)
 Gene Leone – vocal recording (8)
 Mick Guzauski – recording (10), mixing (10)
 Clark Germain – engineer (10)
 Jeffrey "Woody" Woodruff – engineer (10)
 Jeff Chestek – recording assistant (2)
 Donnell Sullivan – mix assistant (2)
 Ronnie DeStasio – assistant engineer (3, 9, 11)
 Alphonse Faggiolo – assistant engineer (3, 9, 11)
 Adam Silverman – assistant engineer (3, 9, 11)
 John Sullivan – assistant engineer (3, 9, 11)
 Sal Viarellie – assistant engineer (3, 9, 11)
 Coke Johnson – assistant engineer (4)
 David Dill – recording assistant (5)
 Scott Gootman – recording assistant (5)
 Dana Jon Chappelle – assistant engineer (7)
 Tom Armeni – assistant engineer (10)
 Steve Hall – mastering at Future Disc (Hollywood, California)
 Christopher Lofaro – production coordinator (1)
 Amy Dakos – design 
 John Kosh – design 
 Carol Friedman – photography 
 Gallin Morey Associates – management

Charts

Weekly charts

Year-end charts

References

1989 albums
Patti LaBelle albums
Albums produced by Prince (musician)
Albums produced by Burt Bacharach
Albums produced by Narada Michael Walden
Albums produced by Stewart Levine
Albums produced by Full Force
MCA Records albums
New jack swing albums